Zaldierna is a village in the municipality of Ezcaray, in the province and autonomous community of La Rioja, Spain. As of 2019 had a population of 26 people.

References

Populated places in La Rioja (Spain)